Erich Padalewski (1930–2018) was an Austrian stage, film and television actor.

Selected filmography
 Dance with Me Into the Morning (1962)
 Our Crazy Nieces (1963)
 Don't Fool with Me (1963)
 Call of the Forest (1965)
 House of Pleasure (1969)
 Housewives on the Job (1972)
 Always Trouble with the Reverend (1972)
 Alpine Glow in Dirndlrock (1974)
 To the Bitter End (1975)
 Crime and Passion (1976)
 The Mimosa Wants to Blossom Too (1976)
 Love Hotel in Tyrol (1978)

References

Bibliography 
 Roman Schliesser & Leo Moser. Die Supernase: Karl Spiehs und seine Filme. Ueberreuter, 2006.

External links 
 

1930 births
2018 deaths
Male actors from Vienna
Austrian male film actors
Austrian male television actors
Austrian male stage actors